Jacques de Foix was a sixteenth century Catholic Bishop of Oloron and then Lescar, both in France.

Early life

De Foix was the son of an unknown mistress and Jacques de Foix Infante de Navarra (1469-1500), Count de Montfort. He was a grandson of Gaston IV, Count of Foix and Eleanor of Navarre, monarch of the Kingdom of Navarre.

Catholic bishop

He was Bishop of Oloron from 1521 until 1534 and Bishop of Lescar from 1534 until 1553.  He probably died 7 Apr 1553.

See also 
Catholic Church in France

References

Further reading
 
 

Bishops of Oloron
16th-century French Roman Catholic bishops